At least two ships of the Hellenic Navy have borne the name Matrozos :

  a  captured by the Royal Navy in 1942 and renamed on transfer to Greece in 1943. She was stricken in 1947.
  a Type 214 submarine commissioned in 2016.

Hellenic Navy ship names